Steven Peter Graham Burton (born 10 October 1982) is an English footballer who last played for Östersunds FK.

Career
Born in Hull, Burton, a left footed defender, worked his way through the Hull City Academy and was taken on as a Youth Trainee within the School of Excellence. He was given his first start by youth coach Billy Russell (now caretaker manager), in an evening match against Rochdale on 12 October 2000. There he was seen by Peter Taylor, who gave Burton a further year's contract. 
Unable to maintain a first team place with Hull, Burton was sent on loan to various clubs including Kidderminster Harriers, where Hull City's former manager, Jan Molby, was in charge. Molby eventually managed to lure Burton away from Hull and to agree permanent terms at Kidderminster. Following one successful season at Aggborough Stadium, Kidderminster started to flounder and Molby was released. His replacement, Stuart Watkiss, left Burton out of his first team plans and, with fewer matches for Burton, he left to pursue a career in football in Melbourne, Australia with Richmond. After one season with Richmond, Burton joined Green Gully. In October 2010 he returned to England and signed for North Ferriby United. After five months in England with North Ferriby United signed in March 2011 for Östersunds FK.(Sweden)

Notes

External links

1982 births
Living people
Footballers from Kingston upon Hull
English footballers
Association football fullbacks
Hull City A.F.C. players
Kidderminster Harriers F.C. players
Richmond SC players
Green Gully SC players
North Ferriby United A.F.C. players
Östersunds FK players
English Football League players